The St. John the Baptist Macedonian Orthodox Church (Makedonska Pravoslavna Crkva "Sv. Jovan Krstitel") is a Macedonian Orthodox church serving the regional city of Geelong, Victoria, Australia. The church borders Geelong and is itself located on the outskirts of Batesford, a regional town.  

A sizable community of Macedonians emerged in the region after their immigration from Macedonia while it was part of Yugoslavia. The construction of the St. John the Baptist Church followed, commencing in 1971. Mile Stojanovski and Jovan Angelkovski led efforts to establish a church presence at Geelong. Other local Macedonian activists who assisted in building St. John the Baptist were Cvetko and Venta Pačovski, Ilija Nikolovski, Tome Dimovski, Luba Ilievska, and Dimitar Angelovski. Kiril, a Macedonian Orthodox Metropolitan, consecrated the church in 1978.

See also 

 Macedonian Australians

References

External links 
website
Facebook

Macedonian Orthodox churches in Australia
Macedonian-Australian culture